Arcicella aurantiaca  is a Gram-negative, strictly aerobic, vibrioid and non-motile bacterium from the genus of Arcicella which has been isolated from stream water in Kaohsiung in Taiwan.

References

External links
Type strain of Arcicella aurantiaca at BacDive -  the Bacterial Diversity Metadatabase	

Cytophagia
Bacteria described in 2010